Lúcio Carlos Cajueiro Souza (born 20 June 1979), commonly known as Lúcio, is a Brazilian former professional footballer.

Career
Lúcio was born in Olinda, Recife, Pernambuco. In his career he played for clubs like Unibol (1997–1999), São Bento, Gama and XV de Piracicaba (2000–2001), Ituano and São Caetano (2002), Palmeiras (2003–2006) and São Paulo (2006). In January 2007, he was signed by Bundesliga club Hertha BSC.

In September 2007, he suffered a knee injury which threatened to end his career. He was ruled him for the rest of the 2007–08 season, and most of the 2008–09 season. After almost a year and a half, he was finally able to play again, making a late appearance in Hertha's UEFA Cup match against Olympiacos. However, Lúcio was unable to reestablish himself in the team and on 18 August 2009, Hertha loaned him to Gremio. In July 2010 he moved to Grêmio on a free transfer from Hertha BSC.

Honours
 São Paulo State Championship: 2002
 Rio Grande do Sul Championship: 2007
 Brazilian Championship: 2006

References

External links
 
 

1979 births
Living people
Sportspeople from Pernambuco
Brazilian footballers
Association football defenders
Esporte Clube São Bento players
Sociedade Esportiva do Gama players
Esporte Clube XV de Novembro (Piracicaba) players
Ituano FC players
Sociedade Esportiva Palmeiras players
São Paulo FC players
Grêmio Foot-Ball Porto Alegrense players
Clube Náutico Capibaribe players
Fortaleza Esporte Clube players
Brazilian expatriate footballers
Expatriate footballers in Germany
Campeonato Brasileiro Série A players
Bundesliga players
Hertha BSC players
Brazilian expatriate sportspeople in Germany
Salgueiro Atlético Clube players
Santa Cruz Futebol Clube players
Veranópolis Esporte Clube Recreativo e Cultural players